The 1889 Amherst football team was an American football team that represented the Amherst College during the 1889 college football season. Lead by first-year head coach Harry A. Smith, the team compiled an overall record of 4–7–1, placing third in the Triangular Football League (TFL) with a mark of 0–2.

Schedule

References

Amherst
Amherst Mammoths football seasons
Amherst football